Mount Benson is a  mountain summit located in the Kenai Mountains, on the Kenai Peninsula, in the U.S. state of Alaska. Originally named Iron Mountain, the mountain's name was officially changed in 1974 by the United States Geological Survey to honor Benny Benson (1913-1972), who at age 13 designed Alaska's flag in 1927, as a student in Seward.

Climate

Based on the Köppen climate classification, Mount Benson is located in a subarctic climate zone with long, cold, snowy winters, and mild summers. Temperatures can drop below −20 °C with wind chill factors below −30 °C. This climate supports a spruce and hemlock forest on the lower slopes. The months May and June offer the most favorable weather for viewing.

See also

List of mountain peaks of Alaska
Geology of Alaska

References

Gallery

External links
 Mount Benson Weather forecast

Benson
Benson
Benson
Benson